Raghunathpura is a village in Sri Ganganagar district of Rajasthan.It is situated on the right bank of Anupgarh branch that is largest and fastest branch of Indira gandhi Nahar pariyojna (IGNP) This is largest irrigation system of Rajasthan. It is a major village in the district. It is divided into two suburbs, Raghunathpura and Raghunathpura Aabadi. It is an Historical  village located some 41 km south- west of Suratgarh and around 103 km off to Sriganganagar. Kalyankot is  the nearest railway station of Raghunathpura. It is 28 km off National Highway NH-62 and 399 km from the state capital, Jaipur. Raghunthpura is located on the link road of Sri vijaynagar to Rajiyasar.  In Raghunathpura 11 ward zones are situated and ward no. 06 is the oldest area of the village. In Raghunthapura there are so many spiritual places are situated. Old Hanuman ji temple, Thakur ji Maharaj temple, Gusai  ji Maharaj temple, Bhabhuta  siddh temple, Hariram baba temple and Ramdev baba temple are very famous for pilgrims. Raghunathpura is growing up very rapidly in all sectors.In some previous year so many youths are selected in many Govt services. Like Engineer, RAS, S.O., Principal, headmaster, teacher, PTI, Constable, VDO , Patwari and so many more.

Language 
Bagri is the major language. Punjabi is also used as a second language in the area and as the predominant language in northern areas along the border of Punjab. Hindi is the state language and English is also used among officials and youth.

Culture 
Raghunathpura village contains a wide cultural diversity. Most of the people from the village are farmers. The village has a traditional Punjabi culture with Bagri influence.

Raghunathpura's music is different than that of the rest of the state (Rajasthan). People sing Punjabi songs, Hindi songs, Rajasthani songs, etc. Punjabi music adds more symphony to the art and culture of this village.

Profession 
The major work of the village is farming; major crops include rice, bajra, cotton, wheat, and vegetables. Punjab National Bank fulfills all the banking needs of the village.The most famous youth of the village Vikas Sharma s/o Anantram Sharma is an excellent volleyball player and poet and a singer of this village.

Grid sub-station 

Raghunathpura is now the first village in Sriganganagar district to complete first gss and open. The Raghunathpura gss started on 19 July 2018. Gss will supply electricity all the gram panchayat villages like 10RD, 1Rm, 40rd, 2gsm, 24sd, 22GB, sukhchainpura etc.

Climate 
The climate of Raghunathpura varies to extreme limits. The summer temperature reaches 50° Celsius and the winter temperature dips to around 0° Celsius. The average annual rainfall is only 176 mm (6.92 in). The average maximum temperature in summer is around 43.8 °C and the average minimum temperature in winter is around 13.4 °C.

Education 
The village has one government higher secondary school for boys and girls and one government primary school. There are also a number of non-government schools for middle and secondary education.

 Government Senior Secondary School, Raghunathpura
 Government Balika Secondary School, Raghunathpura (Girls)
 Government Upper Primary School, New Aabadi Raghunathpura
 Indra Gandhi Memorial School, Raghunathpura
 Aarti Sikshan Sansthan School, New Aabadi Raghunathpura

References 

Villages in Sri Ganganagar district